It's You, It's Me is the debut studio album by American house DJ Kaskade. It was released on March 18, 2003, by OM Records.

A deluxe edition of the album was released on March 28, 2013, before Kaskade's It's You, It's Me Redux tour. The deluxe album edition contains the full-length original album with tracks and remixes from Kaskade's first four official singles: "What I Say", "Gonna Make It", "I Feel It" and "It's You, It's Me". The nine-city tour commemorates ten years of the album's release by performing in areas similar to where the artist began.

Track listing

Deluxe Edition

Personnel
 Ryan Raddon (Kaskade) – Production (all tracks), Writing (all tracks)
 Finn Bjarnson – Additional Production (all tracks), Writing (all tracks)
 Yoni Gileadi – Additional Production (all tracks), Writing (all tracks except 13)
 Craig Poole – Writing (3, 4, 8), Bass
 Rob Wannamaker – Writing (3, 8, 12), Vocals in "What I Say" (Soft Shuffle Mix) and "Get Busy", Keyboards
 Amy Michelle – Vocals in "Seeing Julie", "Tonight" and "Close"
 Joslyn Petty (Joslyn) – Vocals in "Meditation to the Groove", "I Feel Like", "This Rhythm", "It's You, It's Me" and "My Time"
 Scott Johnson – Electric Piano
 Rich Dixon – Guitar
 Darron Bradford – Flute
 Nathan Botts – Trumpet
 Mike Roskelley – Mixing
 Barry Gibbons – Mastering

External links
 Kaskade. Facebook. May 10, 2013.
 It's You, It's Me Redux.. Twitter. Kaskade. April 1, 2013.
 It's You, It's Me at Discogs

Notes and references

2003 debut albums
Kaskade albums